Tauler is a Catalan surname. Notable people with the surname include:

Cristóbal Tauler (1894–?), Spanish Olympic sports shooter
Johannes Tauler (c. 1300–1361), German mystic theologian
Toni Tauler (born 1974), Spanish cyclist

Catalan-language surnames